General elections were held in Guinea-Bissau on 13 April 2014, with a second round for the presidential elections held on 18 May since no candidate received a majority in the first round. Several logistic problems and delays caused the elections to be repeatedly postponed, having initially been scheduled for 24 November 2013 and then 16 March 2014. In the second round, José Mário Vaz of the African Party for the Independence of Guinea and Cape Verde was declared the president-elect with 62% of the vote.

Background

The elections were the result of a military coup in 2012 cancelling the elections that year. 
On 26 February 2014, the UN Security Council urged Guinea-Bissau's transitional government to abide by announced election plans, warning of sanctions against those opposing a return to constitutional order.

Former President Kumba Ialá died a few weeks before the elections.

Electoral system
The President were elected using the two-round system, whilst the 102 members of the National People's Assembly were elected using proportional representation from 27 multi-member constituencies. Article 33 of Guinea-Bissau's Electoral Law prohibits the publishing of any opinion polls.

Candidates and parties
Thirteen presidential candidates were confirmed by the High Court of Justice, whilst eight candidates were rejected.

The Court approved fifteen parties to contest the National People's Assembly election, but rejected applications from seven other parties; the National African Congress, the Guinean Civic Forum-Social Democracy, the Democratic Party for Development, the Guinean Democratic Movement, the Patriotic Movement, the Guinean League for Ecological Protection and the Party for Democracy, Development and Citizenship.

Results

President

National People's Assembly

References

Elections in Guinea-Bissau
Guinea-Bissau
2014 in Guinea-Bissau
Presidential elections in Guinea-Bissau
April 2014 events in Africa
May 2014 events in Africa